is a former Nippon Professional Baseball player and current manager. Nishimura spent the entirety of his 16-year playing career with the Chiba Lotte Marines. After retiring, he coached for the team until being named the successor to former Marines-manager Bobby Valentine in late 2009.

External links

Living people
1960 births
Baseball people from Miyazaki Prefecture
Japanese baseball players
Nippon Professional Baseball outfielders
Nippon Professional Baseball infielders
Lotte Orions players
Chiba Lotte Marines players
Managers of baseball teams in Japan
Chiba Lotte Marines managers
Orix Buffaloes managers